Kiliia or Kilia is a town in Izmail Raion, Odesa Oblast of southwestern Ukraine. It hosts the administration of Kiliia urban hromada, one of the hromadas of Ukraine. Kiliia is located in the Danube Delta, in the Bessarabian historic district of Budjak; across the river lies the Romanian town of Chilia Veche (Old Kiliia). The Chilia branch of the Danube river, which separates Ukraine from Romania, is named after it. Population:

History

A town on the Romanian side of the Chilia branch of the Danube, now known as Chilia Veche (translit. Stara Kiliia) or "Old Chilia", was founded by the Greek Byzantines – κελλία, kellia in Greek being the equivalent of "granaries", a name first recorded in 1241, in the works of the Persian chronicler Rashid-al-Din Hamadani. Kiliia is therefore sometimes referred to as Nova Kiliia meaning "New Kiliia". 

In the place that is now Kiliia, a large colony was established by the Republic of Genoa, known as "Licostomo" and headed by a consul (a representative of the Republic in the region). From that time, only the defensive ditches of a Genoese fortress remained.

The city was founded by Stephen the Great of Moldavia, in order to counteract the Ottoman Empire which had taken control over Chilia Veche in the 15th century. It was a major Moldavian port. However, it was eventually conquered by the Ottomans in 1484, who kept it until 1790, when it was taken by Russian army under the command of the general Ivan Gudovich during Russo-Turkish War (1787–1792). The Times of London reported that "35,000 of the inhabitants were involved in a general massacre," an incident that had "been celebrated in prose and poetry." 
 The city was given back to the Ottomans in 1792, but retaken by the Russians in 1806 and awarded to them officially in 1812.

After being bombarded by the Anglo-French fleet in July 1854 during the Crimean War, it was given to Romania in the Treaty of Paris (1856). In 1878, Kiliia was transferred back to Russia together with Budjak. Between 1918 and 1940 it was again part of Romania, then integrated in the Soviet Union and the Ukrainian SSR (it was briefly held yet again by Romania, from 1941 to 1944, in World War II, time during which it was the capital of the Chilia County), and passed on to independent Ukraine after the Soviet downfall.

The oldest building in Kiliia is the semi-subterranean church of St. Nicholas, which may go back to 1485, although an old inscription in the church claims that it was founded on 10 May 1647.

Notable residents

Ihor Nesterenko (born 1990), Israeli-Ukrainian basketball player in the Israel Basketball Premier League

Gallery

References 

Cities in Odesa Oblast
Castles in Ukraine
Castles in Moldavia
Territories of the Republic of Genoa
Populated places on the Danube
Romania–Ukraine border crossings
Port cities and towns in Ukraine
Port cities of the Black Sea
Cities of district significance in Ukraine
Ismail County
Chilia County
Izmailsky Uyezd
Cities in Izmail Raion